East End Angels is a 2010 Norwegian children's film directed by Lars Berg, starring Emma Høgh Åslein, Nini Bakke Kristiansen and Helene Nybråten. 12-year old Maja (Høgh Åslein), Rikke (Bakke Kristiansen) and Ohna (Nybråten) are planning on doing nothing all summer. Then Ohna's family gets framed for involvement in the drug trade, and the girls have to solve the mystery.

External links
 
 
 Asfaltenglene at the Norwegian Film Institute

2010 films
Norwegian children's films
2010s mystery films
2010s Norwegian-language films